Not by Choice is a Canadian punk rock band from Ajax.  They have released two albums, Maybe One Day in 2002 (Linus Records/Warner Music Canada), and Secondhand Opinions (Maple Music Recordings/Universal Music Canada) in 2004.

History

2002-2003: Debut album and acclaim
In 2002, Not By Choice signed with Linus Entertainment. That same year, the band released their debut album, Maybe One Day. The band earned a MuchMusic Video Award for "Best Independent Video" ("Now That You Are Leaving"), a CASBY award for "Best Independent Album", and inclusion on two Big Shiny Tunes compilations (Now That You Are Leaving and Standing All Alone). In 2003, the band signed with MapleMusic Recordings. Maybe One Day was released in Japan in December 2003, selling over 25,000 records in the country.

2004-2005: Second album, Bovaird departure
The band's October 2004 release of their second album, Secondhand Opinions, presented a different direction from the pop-punk roots of Maybe One Day with a more mature-sounding musical approach.  The album was not well received by commercial radio, and did not meet the expectations set by the success of their first album.  Despite a heavy push from Much Music with their video for the first single Days Go By, the band did not tour outside of Southern Ontario for more than a handful of sporadic dates.  They were given the opening band slot for Avril Lavigne's 2005 summer tour in Southern Ontario, but the effort came almost 8 months after the release of Secondhand Opinions.

The band did prove to have a faithful following in Japan, and Secondhand Opinions did manage to receive a great deal of attention.  The band was able to tour Japan in March 2005, performing a week of headlining shows followed by a week as the opening band for Simple Plan.

After the departure of bassist AJ Bovaird during the summer of 2005, Not by Choice took a break from touring and began writing songs for a new album. However, the band later stopped progress on their third studio album and took an indefinite hiatus.

2017-present: reunion
On April 10, 2017, Not By Choice announced that the classic lineup would be reuniting to play live as the main support for Simple Plan's No Pads, No Helmets...Just Balls 15th anniversary tour stop in Toronto. This show occurred on September 16, 2017.

In 2018, Not By Choice performed at the Sound of Music Festival in Burlington, Ontario.

Discography

Albums
2002: Maybe One Day
2004: Secondhand Opinions

Music videos

Members
 Mike Bilcox – guitar, lead vocals
 Glenn "Chico" Dunning – guitar, backing vocals
 Liam Killeen – drums
 AJ Bovaird – bass, backing vocals

Singles
2002: "Standing All Alone"
2002: "Now That You Are Leaving"
2004: "Days Go By"

References

Musical groups established in 1997
Musical groups reestablished in 2017
Musical groups from the Regional Municipality of Durham
Canadian pop punk groups
MapleMusic Recordings artists
1997 establishments in Ontario